The Van Sant Covered Bridge (Van Sandt Covered Bridge), also known as the Beaver Dam Bridge, is a historic covered bridge located in Solebury Township, near New Hope in Bucks County, Pennsylvania.  Built in 1875, the 86 foot, town truss span crosses the Pidcock Creek near Washington Crossing State Park.

It was added to the National Register of Historic Places on December 1, 1980.

References

Covered bridges on the National Register of Historic Places in Pennsylvania
Covered bridges in Bucks County, Pennsylvania
Wooden bridges in Pennsylvania
Bridges in Bucks County, Pennsylvania
Bridges completed in 1875
Tourist attractions in Bucks County, Pennsylvania
National Register of Historic Places in Bucks County, Pennsylvania
Road bridges on the National Register of Historic Places in Pennsylvania
Lattice truss bridges in the United States